The Disney Character Warehouse is the name of two outlet stores in Orlando, Florida, one in the Orlando Outlet Marketplace and one in the Orlando Vineland Premium Outlets that sell discounted surplus merchandise from nearby Walt Disney World. On September 17, 2020, both stores reopened after being closed for a time due to the COVID-19 pandemic in Florida.

See also
Disney Store

References

Walt Disney World
Economy of Orlando, Florida